Starosielce (lit. Old Settlement) is one of the districts of the City of Białystok, Poland.

History
The history of Starosielce is closely related to the Iron Railway Repair Center established in 1872. The settlement developed quickly with people pulled to the area. The railway authorities willingly employed both newcomers from Russia who worked on the railway or in the metal industry, as well as professionals associated with the construction of the Saint Petersburg–Warsaw Railway just before the January Uprising. Many builders also settled in Bialystok and the nearby villages of Klepacze and Oliszki. Owners also came from Polish landed estates that were under the Tsarist partition. After the First World War and the victory of the newly established Poland over the Soviet Union, many legionnaire soldiers settled in Starosielce. Legionnaire Mieczysław Bieguński lived in the district and member of the city council. He was active in the social committee for the construction of the Monument of Independence, which was set up on the square next to the train station, and in the foundation, which through residents' contributions issued a commemorative plaque on the anniversary of the death of Józef Piłsudski. After the Second World War and the establishment of the People's Republic of Poland everything related to the Marshal, his life and activities was banned. and so, the board has been hidden. In the 1970s, during the demolition of the house where Bieguński's shop was, the workers found a cracked plaque in the basement of the house. In 1954 the village was incorporated to Białystok.

External links

References

Districts of Białystok